Vermitigris is a genus of wormlion in the family Vermileonidae.

Species
Vermitigris fairchildi Wheeler, 1930
Vermitigris infasciatus Oldroyd, 1947
Vermitigris orientalis (Brunetti, 1927)
Vermitigris sinensis Yang, 1988

References

Diptera of Asia
Brachycera genera
Taxa named by William Morton Wheeler
Vermileonomorpha